Beth Leavel (born November 1, 1955) is a Tony Award-winning American stage and screen actress and singer.

Life and career
Leavel attended Needham B. Broughton High School and Meredith College, earning a degree in social work. She completed a graduate theatre degree at the University of North Carolina at Greensboro in 1980. She acted during college, appearing in productions such as Cabaret and Hello, Dolly!

Her Broadway debut was in the 1980 production of 42nd Street as a replacement for Annie. Leavel was in the original Broadway cast of Crazy for You (1992) as Tess and an understudy for Polly Baker.

In 1999, she played the roles of Mabel and Mrs. Bixby in The Civil War. Leavel returned to the Broadway revival of 42nd Street in 2001 as a standby for Maggie Jones and Dorothy Brock, eventually playing the latter.

She played the starring role of Beatrice Stockwell in The Drowsy Chaperone, for which she helped to create the character's backstory and which she referred to as "a compilation of a lot of different women in theatre." For this role, she received a Tony Award and a Drama Desk Award for Best Featured Actress in a Musical.

Leavel succeeded Andrea Martin as Frau Blucher in the Broadway production of Young Frankenstein on July 15, 2008, and remained with the show until it closed on January 4, 2009. She starred in the world premiere of the burlesque-rich musical Minsky's in Los Angeles, which ran at the Center Theatre in the Ahmanson Theatre from January 21-March 1, 2009; the musical also starred her former Young Frankenstein co-stars Christopher Fitzgerald and Sarrah Strimel.

In 2009, Leavel starred in a stage reading of Dylan Glatthorn's Republic with Lauren Worsham and Kelli Barrett. She also starred in the staged reading of Vincent Crapelli's Otherwise, with Karen Ziemba and Laura Bonarrigo-Koffman.

She starred as Donna Sheridan in the Broadway production of Mamma Mia!, succeeding Carolee Carmello in the role on September 22, 2009, and leaving the show on October 10, 2010.

Leavel starred as Emily Hobbs in Elf the Musical on Broadway. The production opened November 14, 2010, at the Al Hirschfeld Theatre and ran through January 2, 2011. Following Elf, she appeared in the Broadway production of Baby It's You!, which began previews on March 26, 2011, and closed on September 4, 2011. Leavel earned a Tony Award nomination for Best Leading Actress in a Musical for her performance of Florence Greenberg in Baby It's You!

In November 2013, she appeared Off-Broadway at the Minetta Lane Theatre in Standing on Ceremony: The Gay Marriage Plays. In January and February 2012, she starred in a limited run of Boeing-Boeing at the Paper Mill Playhouse in Millburn, New Jersey.

Leavel was cast as Bea in the musical Something Rotten! and began the workshop/reading for it, held in 2014. Before the musical opened on Broadway (in March 2015) she was replaced by Heidi Blickenstaff because "the writers decided that the character needed to be younger so she could become pregnant, a key plot point."

In 2014, Leavel starred in the world premiere of the musical Dog and Pony at the Old Globe Theatre, San Diego.

She starred in the musical The Prom which opened on Broadway in November 2018. For this, she was nominated for the 2019 Tony Award for Best Performance by Leading Actress in a Musical.

In 2022, she starred as Miranda Priestly in the Chicago world premiere production of The Devil Wears Prada.

Personal life
She is engaged to fellow actor Adam Heller.

Performances

Broadway

Television

Podcasts

Awards and nominations

References

External links
 
 

1955 births
Living people
Actresses from New Jersey
Actresses from North Carolina
American musical theatre actresses
Drama Desk Award winners
People from Harrington Park, New Jersey
Actors from Raleigh, North Carolina
Tony Award winners
Meredith College alumni
Musicians from Raleigh, North Carolina
University of North Carolina at Greensboro alumni
Singers from North Carolina
20th-century American actresses
20th-century American singers
20th-century American women singers
21st-century American actresses
21st-century American singers
21st-century American women singers
Singers from New Jersey